This is a list of women artists who were born in Iceland or whose artworks are closely associated with that country.

A
Anna Jóelsdóttir (born 1947), contemporary artist

G
Gabríela Friðriksdóttir (born 1971), painter, sculptor
Gunnhildur Hauksdóttir (born 1972), visual artist
Gerður Helgadóttir (1928–1975), sculptor, stained-glass artist
Gunnfríður Jónsdóttir (1889–1968), sculptor

J
Júlíana Sveinsdóttir (1889–1966), early female painter, textile artist

K
Katrín Sigurdardóttir (born 1967), sculptor and installation artist
Kristín Jónsdóttir (1888–1959), pioneering female painter

L
Louisa Matthíasdóttir (1917–2000), Icelandic-American painter

M
Margret the Adroit (early 13th century), carver

N
Nína Sæmundsson (1892–1965), sculptor, painter
Nína Tryggvadóttir (1913–1968), abstract expressionist artist

T
Þorbjörg Pálsdóttir (1919–2009), sculptor

-
Icelandic women artists, List of
Artists
Artists